The 1863 Grand National was the 25th renewal of the Grand National horse race that took place at Aintree near Liverpool, England, on 11 March 1863.

The winning mare's full sister Emblematic won the race the following year.

Finishing Order

Non-finishers

References

 1863
Grand National
Grand National
19th century in Lancashire
March 1863 sports events